Superwombling was the fourth and final studio album released by the Wombles. The songs were recorded by Mike Batt (vocals/keyboards) with session musicians Chris Spedding (guitars), Les Hurdle (bass), Clem Cattini (drums), Ray Cooper (percussion), Rex Morris (sax), Eddie Mordue (sax) and Jack Rothstein (violin).

The various musical styles of the songs include rock, pop, blues, reggae, barbershop harmony and James Bond themes.

"The Myths and Legends of King Merton Womble and His Journey to the Centre of the Earth" is a parody of two contemporary concept albums – The Myths and Legends of King Arthur and the Knights of the Round Table and Journey to the Centre of the Earth – both by Rick Wakeman.

Despite having several successful singles, the album did not chart but did eventually go Gold.

Track listing
All songs written by Mike Batt.

Side one
 The Womble Shuffle – 2:49
 The Myths and Legends of King Merton Womble and His Journey to the Centre of the Earth – 5:27
 Down at the Barber Shop – 1:59
 The Empty Tidy-Bag Blues – 4:11
 Wombling White Tie and Tails – 3:32

Side two
 Superwomble – 3:23
 Miss Adelaide (She's Got a Lot of Knowledge) – 3:57
 Wombles on Parade – 3:41
 To Wimbledon with Love – 3:50
 Nashville Wombles – 4:55

Singles
"Wombling White Tie And Tails", "Superwomble" and "The Womble Shuffle" were released as singles. "Down At The Barber Shop" was later released on the B-side of "Let's Womble To The Party Tonight".

"Wombling White Tie And Tails" was used in the soundtrack of the 1977 film "Wombling Free".

References

The Wombles albums
1975 albums
Albums produced by Mike Batt